Deleatrice "Dee" Alexander is an American jazz singer. She is a member of the AACM and appeared at the Newport Jazz Festival in 2013.

Alexander is the host of Sunday Jazz with Dee Alexander, a radio show on WDCB and the WFMT Radio Network.

Discography
 Live at the Hothouse (self-released, 2004)
 Wondrous Fascination (self-released, 2007)
 Wild Is the Wind (Blujazz, 2009)
 Sketches of Light (EGEA-UJ, 2012)
 Songs My Mother Loves (Blujazz, 2013)

With Ernest Dawkins
 Memory in the Center (Dawk Music, 2014)

With Malachi Thompson
47th Street (Delmark, 1997)
Rising Daystar (Delmark, 1999)
Blue Jazz (Delmark, 2003) with Gary Bartz and Billy Harper

References

American women singers
American jazz singers
American women jazz singers
Musicians from Chicago
Jazz musicians from Illinois